Texas County is the name of two counties in the United States:

 Texas County, Missouri
 Texas County, Oklahoma

See also
 List of counties in Texas